Execute, in capital punishment, is to put someone to death.

Execute may also refer to:
Execution (computing), the running of a computer program
Execute (album), a 2001 Garage hip-hop album by Oxide & Neutrino
USS Execute (AM-232), an Admirable-class minesweeper
"Execute", the first track on Slipknot's 2008 album All Hope Is Gone

See also
Execution (disambiguation)